In Ancient Rome territorial organization, a conventus iuridicus was the capital city of a subdivision of some provinces (Dalmatia, Hispania, Asia) with functions of seat of a district court of justice and maybe others.

References

Ancient Roman government